|}

The Galway Plate is a National Hunt chase in Ireland which is open to horses aged four years or older. It is run at Galway over a distance of about 2 miles and 6½ furlongs (2 miles 6 furlongs and 111 yards, or 4,779 metres), and during its running there are fourteen fences to be jumped. It is a handicap race, and it is scheduled to take place each year in late July or early August.

The event is held during the seven-day Galway Festival meeting. It was established in 1869, and the inaugural running was won by Absentee. The most successful horse in the race's history is Tipperary Boy, who won three times – in 1899, 1901 and 1902. It was formerly contested over 2 miles and 5 furlongs, but this was extended to 2 miles and 6 furlongs in 1992 and extended by a further half a furlong to the present distance in 2015. The Galway Plate was sponsored by William Hill from 2006 to 2010 and by Tote Ireland since 2011.

Anne Collen was the first lady trainer winning the plate with Randoss in the 1987 Galway Plate National Hunt Chase. Her sister, Sarah Collen, was also the first lady jockey to win the Galway Plate aboard Bold Flyer in 1989.

Records
Most successful horse since 1988 (2 wins):
 Life of a Lord – 1995, 1996
 Ansar  – 2004, 2005

Leading jockey since 1988 (2 wins):
 Adrian Maguire – The Gooser (1992), General Idea (1993)
 Ruby Walsh – Moscow Express  (1999), Oslot  (2008)
 Mark Walsh – Bob Lingo (2012), Early Doors (2020)
 Paul Townend -  Blazing Tempo (2011), Royal Rendevzous (2021) 

Leading trainer since 1988 (4 wins):
 Dermot Weld – Kiichi  (1990), General Idea (1993), Ansar (2004, 2005)

Winners since 1988
 Weights given in stones and pounds.

Earlier winners

 1869 - Absentee
 1872 - Belle
 1879 - Liberator
 1882 - Sugar Plum
 1891 - Queen of the May
 1897 - Drogheda
 1899 - Tipperary Boy
 1901 - Tipperary Boy
 1902 - Tipperary Boy
 1906 - Royal Tara
 1910 - Ashbrooke
 1913 - George B
 1915 - Hill of Camas
 1917 - Privit
 1934 - Reviewer
 1945 - Grecian Victory
 1950 - Derrinstown
 1951 - St Kathleen II
 1952 - Alberoni
 1953 - Gallant Wolf
 1954 - Amber Point
 1955 - Umm
 1956 - Amber Point
 1957 - Knight Errant
 1958 - Hopeful Colleen
 1959 - Highfield Lad
 1960 - Sparkling Flame
 1961 - Clipador
 1962 - Carraroe
 1963 - Blunts Cross
 1964 - Ross Sea
 1965 - Ross Sea
 1966 - Cappawhite
 1967 - Royal Day
 1968 - Terossian
 1969 - Royal Day
 1970 - Lisnaree
 1971 - Sarejay Day
 1972 - Persian Lark
 1973 - Leap Frog
 1974 - Bunclody Tiger
 1975 - Our Albert
 1976 - O'Leary
 1977 - Spittin' Image
 1978 - Shining Flame
 1979 - Hindhope
 1980 - Sir Barry
 1981 - Rugged Lucy
 1982 - The Lady's Master
 1983 - Hamers Flame
 1984 - Master Player
 1985 - Chow Mein
 1986 - Boro Quarter
 1987 - Randoss

See also
 Horse racing in Ireland
 List of Irish National Hunt races

References

 Racing Post:
 carlow-nationalist.ie – "All set for another Ballybrit Bonanza" (2006).
 galway-races.net – "History of the Galway Festival".
 tbheritage.com – "Galway Plate – Search Results".
 timesonline.co.uk – "Glorious Galway" (2006).

National Hunt races in Ireland
National Hunt chases
Recurring sporting events established in 1869
1869 establishments in Ireland
Ballybrit Racecourse